Brandywine is the name of an unincorporated area in Prince George's County, Maryland, United States, that refers both to a census-designated place (CDP) and a zip code area which is much larger (20613), whose areas overlap. The population of Brandywine at the 2020 U.S. Census was 10,550 for the CDP, and the population of ZIP code 20613 was 11,860 in 2010.

Brandywine is in the southernmost area of Prince George’s County, surrounded by a rural setting. It is in the Southern Maryland region. Brandywine is also a suburb of two cities: it lies within the outer suburban Washington D.C. area and is also a close suburb of Waldorf.

Geography
The CDP and town are adjacent to the southern border of Prince George's County, lying east and west of busy Maryland Route 5/U.S. Route 301, which merge at Brandywine.  Brandywine CDP is bordered by Accokeek to the west, Clinton and Rosaryville to the north, Croom to the northeast, and Cedarville to the southeast, all in Prince George's County. Waldorf in Charles County borders Brandywine to the south. The Brandywine zip code area encompasses parts of both counties and includes Cedarville and Baden.

Designated as part of the Prince George's County rural tier, it is primarily rural with a suburban and commercial center.

Demographics

2020 census

Note: the US Census treats Hispanic/Latino as an ethnic category. This table excludes Latinos from the racial categories and assigns them to a separate category. Hispanics/Latinos can be of any race.

2000 Census
As of the census of 2000, there were 1,410 people, 478 households, and 377 families residing in the CDP. The racial makeup of the CDP was 56.24% White, 38.23% African American, 1.13% Native American, 1.13% Asian, 0.07% Pacific Islander, 0.57% from other races, and 2.62% from two or more races. Hispanic or Latino of any race were 0.71% of the population.

There were 478 households, out of which 34.9% had children under the age of 18 living with them, 60.9% were married couples living together, 12.3% had a female householder with no husband present, and 21.1% were non-families. 16.3% of all households were made up of individuals, and 6.7% had someone living alone who was 65 years of age or older. The average household size was 2.95 and the average family size was 3.29.

In the CDP, the population was spread out, with 25.7% under the age of 18, 6.6% from 18 to 24, 30.7% from 25 to 44, 25.7% from 45 to 64, and 11.3% who were 65 years of age or older. The median age was 39 years. For every 100 females, there were 90.8 males. For every 100 females age 18 and over, there were 86.1 males.

The median income for a household in the CDP was $57,063, and the median income for a family was $64,038. Males had a median income of $41,783 versus $35,242 for females. The per capita income for the CDP was $19,035. About 8.6% of families and 10.1% of the population were below the poverty line, including 8.3% of those under age 18 and 17.0% of those age 65 or over.

History
William H. Early named the town of Brandywine as property he owned in the mid-19th century. The CDP consists of the property he owned in the 19th century. It is thought to be named after the Battle of Brandywine of the American Revolutionary War. Brandywine was developed on the Baltimore and Potomac Railroad's Pope Creek (Southern Maryland) line in about 1873 and was the only town on the route that developed into a railroad town.

On September 1, 1877, around 4 p.m., a small 2.7 magnitude earthquake struck Brandywine.

In 1912, the Bank of Brandywine was chartered from what had previously been the Southern Maryland German-American Bank.

Although located between the substantial bedroom cities of Clinton and Waldorf, Brandywine remained rural until after the turn of the twenty-first century, when shopping centers--including big-box stores--and small residential developments were built.  Despite the building of both a major highway overpass and a roundabout in 2019, the community is still notorious for traffic slowdowns due to both daily commuters and interstate travelers.

Historical sites
The following is a list of historic sites in Brandywine, which includes Baden and T.B. identified by the Maryland-National Capital Park and Planning Commission, none of which are currently museums:

Enterprises and recreation

The Brandywine community includes Gwynn Park High School, several well-known automobile salvage lots, and a construction equipment vehicle sales lot. A large commercial center was created with the development of Brandywine Crossing shopping center's opening in October 2008 and growing to 800,000 SF with 49 commercial spaces as of 2016.

Government
Prince George's County Police Department District 5 Station in Clinton CDP and District 7 Station in Fort Washington CDP serve the community.

The U.S. Postal Service operates the Brandywine Post Office.

Education
Brandywine residents are assigned to schools in Prince George's County Public Schools.

Residential areas of the CDP area are zoned to Brandywine Elementary School, Gwynn Park Middle School, and Gwynn Park High School.

Notable people
 Donnie Neuenberger, NASCAR driver
 People from Brandywine

References

External links

 Brandywine, Maryland
 

Census-designated places in Prince George's County, Maryland
Census-designated places in Maryland
Washington metropolitan area